Parliamentary elections were held in Portugal on 28 October 1973. After the only opposition party withdrew from the election, the People's National Action (ANP) was the only list to contest the election, winning all 150 seats. The 1973 election would be the last held under the Estado Novo. Five months later, the Carnation Revolution would bring down Caetano's government. In 1975, the Constituent Assembly of Portugal was elected in the first democratic elections since 1925.

Electoral system
The electoral system, constitutionally amended in 1971, maintained the National Assembly to be elected through plurality voting with semi-open party list in 22 constituencies, with all seats of a constituency going to a sole victor. Voters were formally allowed to strike out individual names. The Chamber of Corporations, consisting of 200 members or more, was appointed by the government following its re-endorsement by the new National Assembly, the last to be before the Carnation Revolution next year.

All natural-born nationals residing in Portugal for the past five years were allowed to stand for election, with all mature, literate citizens officially enlisted for the process. An additional 962,854 overseas citizens participated in an election to the National Assembly for the first time. Some scarcely populated remote countryside regions in the Portuguese overseas territories of Angola and Mozambique were infiltrated by pro-independence guerrillas. Most of Portuguese Guinea (now Guinea-Bissau) was under the control or heavy influence of the guerrillas at the time.

Campaign
Campaigning began on 28 September under the supervision of the regime, while illegal rallies began as early as April. The governing People's National Action, constituted in 1970 from the former National Union, held its first and only congress in May, supervised by Prime Minister Marcello Caetano, who was considered a moderate reformist but who struggled to hold on to Salazar's authoritarian powers.

Following the premature withdrawal of the PDM/CDE, the only opposition party allowed to run on 25 October, due to complaints about its democratic legitimacy, the eligibility and rights of its 66 candidates were revoked for five years.

Results

References

See also
Politics of Portugal
List of political parties in Portugal
Elections in Portugal

Legislative election
Portugal
1973 legislative
October 1973 events in Europe